The Blue Wing Mountains are a mountain range in west central Pershing County, Nevada.

The range is a small northeast trending range typical of the Basin and Range Province. Adjacent to the northwest side of the range is a desert playa of the broad Kumiva Valley. To the west beyond the Kumiva valley lies the Selenite Range. To the southeast lie the Nightingale Mountains and directly south across the narrow Juniper Pass are the closely associated Sahwave Mountains. To the southeast is the Blue Wing Playa of the broad Granite Springs Valley.  Beyond the Granite Springs Valley are the Trinity Range with Lovelock just beyond. The Seven Troughs Range lies just five miles to the east of the Blue Wings.

References 

Mountain ranges of Nevada
Mountain ranges of Pershing County, Nevada